Kachug is an urban locality (an urban-type settlement) in Kachugsky District of Irkutsk Oblast, Russia. Population:

Geography
The settlement is located in the Lena-Angara Plateau.

References

Urban-type settlements in Irkutsk Oblast
Populated places on the Lena River